Blood Stained Shoes is a 2012 Chinese horror film directed by Raymond Yip. Set in the 1930s, it tells the tale of a series of strange murders revolving around a pair of embroidered shoes.

Cast
 Ruby Lin as Su Er
 Kara Hui as Madame Zhen
 Monica Mok as Xu Shi
 Anna Kay as He ChuJun
 Michael Tong as Shen Xuanbai
 Xing Minshan as Wang Zhiyuan
 Jing Gangshan as Cheng Nan, Xu Shi's lover
 Daniel Chan as Shen Xuanqing, Su Er's husband
 Han Zhi as Ding Dashan
 Harashima Daichi as Shen Ling
 Xiao Yuzhen Shen Yi
 Huang Yiyang as Shen He
 Cai Jifang as village elder Yuan
 Dong Jilai as village elder Huang
 Chen Jinhui as village elder Zhang

Storyline
This film is set in  the 1930s, and starts with a strange murder in a beautiful Jiangnan river delta. At the scene, all that is left is an exquisite pair of embroidered shoes. An innocent seamstress is suspected and put to death, but the bloody murders do not stop.

Release
 October 2011, Blood Stained Shoes invited Golden Rooster Award as Top 5 most anticipated movies.
 Blood Stained Shoes had its premiere in Beijing on March 16, 2012. The film will receive wide release on March 31, 2012.

Reception
"smalltown ghost story that's more interesting for its female cast and its curious structure than anything else. In fact, it's the most interesting part of the film, detailing the smalltown characters, the changing lives of its women and shifting family ties. The ghostly section of the film, with guilty parties dropping dead like flies, is relatively brief and not particularly scary "----Derek Elley, Film Business Asia

References

External links

 HK cinemagic page
 Official micro weibo
 Reel China - cri online

2012 horror films
2010s supernatural horror films
Films directed by Raymond Yip
Films set in the 1930s
2012 films
Chinese supernatural horror films